The Pills Versus Planes EP is the debut release from Bloomington, Indiana-based instrumental group, Ativin.

Track listing
 "I Know One-Hundred Things" – 5:30
 "King's Ship" – 5:15
 "Mass" – 4:20
 "Metallic Boy" – 1:17
 "Meditational Flaws" – 7:23

References

1996 debut EPs
Ativin albums
albums produced by Steve Albini
Polyvinyl Record Co. EPs